Naan Avanillai 2 is a 2009 Indian Tamil-language romantic mystery film directed by Selva. It is the sequel to Naan Avanillai (2007). Jeevan reprises the lead role, while the female roles are enacted by Sangeetha, Lakshmi Rai, Shweta Menon, Shruti Marathe, and Rachana Maurya. D. Imman, who did the film score for the first part of the film, replaced Vijay Antony as the music director. The film was released on 27 November 2009.

Plot
Annamalai's (Jeevan) photograph appears in a newspaper along with an interview of Maria (Rachana Maurya), who claims herself to be a saint propounding a new faith. She describes him as her God, Vaali. A mafia-turned-spiritualist, she attributes her transformation to him in the interview. This prompts three women to come calling Maria all the way. The three women were cheated by him recently, and they probe Maria of Annamalai's whereabouts. The three women – Sakhi (Sruthi Marathe), Nisha (Swetha Menon) and an actress named Deepa (Lakshmi Rai) – try to prove to Maria that he was a cheat. However, she does not believe them. Meanwhile, Annamalai suffers bleeding injuries in an accident. Mahalakshmi alias Mahi (Sangeetha), a Lankan woman who runs a restaurant, nurses him back to health. On seeing Mahi separated from his daughter by her late husband's (Krishna) family, he decides to reunite them. He robs money with which he achieves his purpose. Meanwhile, the trio tracks down Annamalai and confronts him. Annamalai goes all the way to a church, where he speaks in his own style and makes the girls believe that he is not the one whom they are searching for and he moves on with his con man job happily.

Cast

Soundtrack
The soundtrack features six songs and one instrumental that composed by D. Imman. The songs received mixed reviews from critics.

Release & Reception
Naan Avanillai 2 gets A certificate from Central Board of Film Certification. The movie received extremely negative reviews upon release and became average grosser.

Sify wrote "The film is an extension of part 1" and that "The film is predictable at every turn and the second half drags big time [sic]". Behindwoods wrote "
Naan Avan Illai 2 tries to repeat the 2007 success story. But, with a weak foundation, it never really stands up. High on glamour, low on interest, it is definitely not an ideal follow up to the prequel." Rediff wrote "A little bit of sentiment and massive dollops of entertainment, that's Naan Avan Illai 2, for you. It lacks a bit of the first movie's originality but if its two-and-a half-hours of no holds barred fun is what you want then this is your best bet."

References

External links

2009 films
Indian sequel films
2000s Tamil-language films
Indian drama films
Films directed by Selva (director)
2009 drama films